Rainer Stadelmann (24 October 1933 – 14 January 2019) was a German Egyptologist. He was considered an expert on the archaeology of the Giza Plateau.

Biography
After studying in Neuburg an der Donau in 1933, he studied Egyptology, orientalism, and archaeology at the University of Munich. He participated in 1955 and 1956 in the excavations of the sun temple of the 5th Dynasty pharaoh Userkaf at Abusir. He continued his studies at the University of Heidelberg, where in 1960 he wrote his doctoral thesis on the Syrian-Palestinian deities in Egypt. He was a technical assistant in Heidelberg until 1967, after which he became scientific director at the German Archaeological Institute in Cairo, where he served from 1989 to 1998.

Since 1975, he was honorary professor at the University of Heidelberg. He participated in numerous excavations at Elephantine, Thebes, and Dahshur; at the latter, he explored and wrote about the Bent Pyramid and the valley temple of King Sneferu. He also opened a new exhibition at the Egyptian Museum, Cairo, to celebrate 40 years of archaeological work by the Japanese.

Selected publications
 Die ägyptischen Pyramiden, vom Ziegelbau zum Weltwunder, Mayence, 1985–1997, éditions von Zabern (Kulturgeschichte der Antiken Welt, Bd. 30),

References

1933 births
2019 deaths
Archaeologists from Bavaria
German Egyptologists
People from Oettingen in Bayern
Ludwig Maximilian University of Munich alumni
Academic staff of Heidelberg University
German male non-fiction writers